Ritzville High School, also known as Old Ritzville High School, was a public high school located in Ritzville, Washington.  It has been listed on the National Register of Historic Places in 1994.  The building was abandoned in 1983 and its demolition was begun on August 17th, 2013, and was completed a few days later.

The current Ritzville High School building is located nearby and is operated by the Ritzville School District.  In 2012 it was merged with Lind High School to become Lind-Ritzville High School.  In May 2013 it had an enrollment of 345 students.

See also
Loren G. McCollom
National Register of Historic Places listings in Washington

References

External links
Lind-Ritzville High School webpage

1927 establishments in Washington (state)
Gothic Revival architecture in Washington (state)
Late Gothic Revival architecture
School buildings completed in 1927
School buildings on the National Register of Historic Places in Washington (state)
Demolished buildings and structures in Washington (state)
National Register of Historic Places in Adams County, Washington
Buildings and structures demolished in 2013